Norman or Norm Ferguson may refer to:

Norm Ferguson (animator) (1902–1957)
Norm Ferguson (ice hockey) (born 1945)

fr:Norm Ferguson